The naval Battle of Borsele took place on 22 April 1573 during the Eighty Years' War between a Spanish fleet commanded by Sancho d'Avila and a Gueux fleet under Admiral Worst.

The Spanish fleet sailed from the port of Antwerp to try to supply the cities of Middelburg and Arnemuiden, which were besieged by Dutch troops. A few ships managed to reach their objective but the bulk of the Spanish ships was forced to return to Antwerp.

Battles involving the Netherlands
Battles involving Spain
Conflicts in 1573
1573 in Europe
1573 in the Habsburg Netherlands
Battles in Zeeland
Borsele